Indigenous Development refers to a variety of coordinated efforts, usually by first world organizations, to support progress in modernizing or bettering life for  specific third world and fourth world populations.

Indigenous Development is generally used to refer to a variety of coordinated programs by governmental, philanthropic, environmental, religious and/or financial organizations to promote the wellbeing of indigenous populations, usually via economic development efforts. However, notable  grassroots programs, such as the Africa Windmill Project started by Malawi inventor William Kamkwamba, have been initiated locally.

Noted organizations involved in Indigenous Development include the World Bank, as well as many private organizations.

Economic development